Glen Beach is located north of Camps Bay Beach in Cape Town, South Africa. The two beaches are divided by a rock outcrop that extends from the land to the shore-line. During the summer months, sand deposits tend to build up at the shore-line, widening both Glen and Camps Bay beaches until the two beaches merge—until winter, when the sand deposits are eroded by winter storms. Glen Beach is well known for its beach-break surfing.

See also
 Beaches of Cape Town

References

Geography of Cape Town
Surfing locations in South Africa